Breuillet may refer to places in France:

 Breuillet, Charente-Maritime
 Breuillet, Essonne